Nymphargus spilotus is a species of frog in the family Centrolenidae, formerly placed in Cochranella.
It is endemic to Colombia where it occurs on the Cordillera Central in Samaná, the Caldas Department.
Its natural habitat is sub-Andean forest where it occurs on vegetation alongside streams. Its conservation status is unclear.

The dorsum is finely shagreen.

References

spilotus
Amphibians of Colombia
Endemic fauna of Colombia
Taxonomy articles created by Polbot
Amphibians described in 1997